Veerendra Patil ministry was the Council of Ministers in Karnataka, a state in South India headed by Veerendra Patil that was formed after Indian National Congress won 178 seats in 224 seat Assembly of Karnataka in 1989 elections.

In the government headed by Veerendra Patil, the Chief Minister was from INC. Apart from the CM, there were other ministers in the government.

Tenure of the Government 
In 1989, Indian National Congress emerged victorious and Veerendra Patil was elected as leader of the Party, hence sworn in as CM in 1989. A year later he submitted resignation and President's Rule was imposed and S. Bangarappa sworn in as Chief Minister later.

Council of Ministers

Chief Minister and deputy Chief Minister

Cabinet Ministers

Minister of State 
If the office of a Minister is vacant for any length of time, it automatically comes under the charge of the Chief Minister.

Chief Whip of Ruling Party
C. S. Nadagouda

See also 
 Karnataka Legislative Assembly

References

External links 

 Council of Ministers

Cabinets established in 1989
1989 establishments in Karnataka
Veerendra Patil
1990 disestablishments in India
Cabinets disestablished in 1990
1989 in Indian politics
Indian National Congress state ministries